The 1964 Paris–Roubaix was the 62nd edition of the Paris–Roubaix cycle race and was held on 19 April 1964. The race started in Compiègne and finished in Roubaix. The race was won by Peter Post of the Flandria team.

General classification

References

1964
1964 in road cycling
1964 in French sport
1964 Super Prestige Pernod
April 1964 sports events in Europe